Besbes is a district in El Taref Province, Algeria. It was named after its capital, Besbes.

Municipalities
The district is further divided into 3 municipalities:
Besbes
Zerizer
Asfour

Districts of El Taref Province